George Stiles may refer to:

George Stiles (composer) (born 1961), British composer
George Stiles (politician), mayor of Baltimore from 1816 to 1819
George P. Stiles (1814–1885), Justice of the Supreme Court of the Utah Territory from 1854 to 1857

See also
George Styles (disambiguation)